

Heinrich-Anton Deboi (6 April 1893 – 20 January 1955) was a German general in the Wehrmacht of Nazi Germany during World War II who held several commands at the divisional levels. He was a recipient of the Knight's Cross of the Iron Cross.

Deboi surrendered to the Red Army at the conclusion of the Battle of Stalingrad in 1943. Convicted as a war criminal in the Soviet Union, he died in captivity in January 1955.

Awards and decorations

 Knight's Cross of the Iron Cross on 10 September 1942 as Generalmajor and commander of 44. Infanterie Division

References

Citations

Bibliography

 

1893 births
1955 deaths
People from Landshut
People from the Kingdom of Bavaria
German Army personnel of World War I
Lieutenant generals of the German Army (Wehrmacht)
German commanders at the Battle of Stalingrad
Recipients of the clasp to the Iron Cross, 1st class
Recipients of the Knight's Cross of the Iron Cross
Recipients of the Gold German Cross
German prisoners of war in World War II held by the Soviet Union
German people who died in Soviet detention
Military personnel from Bavaria